Hamry is a municipality and village in Klatovy District in the Plzeň Region of the Czech Republic. It has about 100 inhabitants.

Etymology
The name Hamry means literally "hammer mills". It refers to the hammer mills that existed here from the 16th century.

Geography
It lies in the Bohemian Forest, on the border with Germany. The Úhlava River flows through the municipality.

Most of the Nýrsko Reservoir is located in the municipal territory. It serves as a source of drinking water for the region.

History
The first written mention of Hamry is from 1429. Between 1524 and 1535, one of the first hammer mills in the Bohemian Forest was founded here. After that, other hammer mills began to be built here, which processed the iron ore mined in the vicinity, and the village developed. Glass smelters, glass grinding plants, mills and sawmills were also established here.

Hamry had a German-speaking majority. After the World War II, Germans were expelled and the population significantly dropped.

Demographics

Sights
The landmark of Hamry is the Church of Our Lady of Sorrows. It was built in the Baroque style in 1773, on the site of an old chapel.

Gallery

References

External links

Villages in Klatovy District
Bohemian Forest